William Frederick Matthews (7 January 1898 - 8 April 1977) CGIA was a leading British bookbinder of the twentieth-century.

Early life and family
William Matthews was born on 7 January 1898. His father was a carpenter also named William Frederick. In August 1921, he married Ellen Rawlinson at the parish church, Tooting, in London.

Career
At the age of 13 he won a scholarship to study at the Central School of Arts and Crafts in London where he was trained by Peter McLeish, Noel Rooke, and Graily Hewitt. He was apprenticed at the bindery of W. T. Morrell & Co. and started his own practice in 1926.

He later taught at the Central School of Arts and Crafts for nearly 50 years, and trained Anthony Cains, Bryan Maggs, H. J. Desmond Yardley, Edgar Mansfield, Roger Powell, and Bernard Middleton.

He was described by Catherine Porter as "one of the greatest craftsmen of the 20th century", being particularly skilled in gold tooling and lettering. His work is generally noted for its "sober dignity" but with bindings produced for pleasure having a "joyful charm". He favoured bindings in oasis morocco with marbled end-pages from Morris Marbles of Oxford. Doublures and end leaves could be in morocco, silk, or vellum. He did his own edge-gilding. 

In 1976, he was the first bookbinder to be awarded the City and Guilds of London Insignia Award (CGIA).

Death and legacy
Matthews died in hospital on 8 April 1977. His home at the end of his life was Track End, Admiral's Way (Admiral's Walk in probate entry), Pirbright in Surrey. His funeral was St Michael and All Angels church in Pirbright, followed by cremation. He left an estate of £27,328. In 1978, his work was the subject of a joint exhibition with Edgar Mansfield at the Victoria & Albert Museum.

Selected publications
 Bookbinding: A manual for those interested in the craft of bookbinding.. Gollancz, London, 1929.
 Simple Bookbinding for Junior Schools. Sir Isaac Pitman & Sons, London, 1930.

References

Further reading 
"Craft Binders at Work 1: William Matthews" by D. Harrop in The Book Collector, Vol. 19 (1970), pp. 465-477.

1898 births
1977 deaths
Bookbinders
English non-fiction writers
Instructors of the Central School of Art and Design